The 2022–23 season is Al-Batin's 44th year in their existence and the sixth non-consecutive season in the Pro League. The club will participate in the Pro League and the King Cup.

The season covers the period from 1 July 2022 to 30 June 2023.

Players

Squad information

Transfers and loans

Transfers in

Loans in

Transfers out

Pre-season

Competitions

Overview

Goalscorers

Last Updated: 14 March 2023

Assists

Last Updated: 14 March 2023

Clean sheets

Last Updated: 9 March 2023

References

Al Batin FC seasons
Batin